Víctor Ruiz del Valle (born 7 June 1969) is a Mexican former football midfielder with Cruz Azul.

Life
Born in Santiago Tepeyahualco, Hidalgo, Mexico.

Career
He made his professional debut with Cruz Azul in the 1992–93 Mexican Primera División season. He was sold to Deportivo Toluca F.C. in 1996, where he would win three Primera titles (Verano 1998, Verano 1999 and Verano 2000). He finished his career with Club Necaxa, retiring in 2006.

Ruiz made 17 appearances and scored six goals for the Mexico national team, participating in the 2001 FIFA Confederations Cup and the qualifiers for the 2002 FIFA World Cup.

International goals

Scores and results list Mexico's goal tally first.

References

External links

1969 births
Living people
Mexican footballers
Mexico international footballers
2001 FIFA Confederations Cup players
Cruz Azul footballers
Deportivo Toluca F.C. players
Club Necaxa footballers
Association football midfielders